Victor Henry Peter Brougham, 4th Baron Brougham and Vaux (23 October 1909 – 20 June 1967), was a British peer and politician.

Background and family
Brougham's father, Henry Brougham, was the son and heir of the 3rd Baron Brougham and Vaux, but predeceased his father, dying just 20 days before his father in May 1927. Victor Brougham succeeded to the title upon his grandfather's death on 24 May 1927.

Brougham was married three times, 
 Valerie Violet French (m. 1931, divorced 1934), granddaughter of Sir John French. They had one son, Julian, who was killed while on active service in Malaya in 1952, at the age of 19. 
 Jean Follet (m. 1935, divorced 1942). They had two sons: Michael (b. 1938), the future 5th Baron, and David (1940–2012).
 Edith Ellaline Teichmann (m. 1942), previously married to Richard Hart-Davis. She was one of a series of society beauties photographed as classical figures by Madame Yevonde.

Life and career
Brougham made his maiden speech in the House of Lords on 8 May 1934, in a debate on Parliamentary Reform, making a strong defence of democracy, concluding "Unless our Parliamentary system adapts itself very soon to the needs of the day, and unless it consciously reforms itself so as to carry out the functions demanded of Governments in modern circumstances, it will be done away with here as surely as it has disappeared in Russia, Germany and Italy."

He fought in the Second World War and gained the rank of 2nd Lieutenant in the Scots Guards. After the war, he served in the Territorial Army, reaching the rank of major.

Lord Brougham enjoyed gambling; in 1932, he auctioned artefacts from Brougham Hall to pay off his debts, and in 1934, the Hall itself was sold. In August 1953, Lord Brougham was declared bankrupt after having spent more than £125 000 on gambling, failed stock market speculation and a failed attempt to become a farmer. In court, he stated that he tried to get work to repay his debts, but working as manual labour, his salary seldom exceeded £10/month, the situation had got out of hands.

Arms

References

1909 births
1967 deaths
British Army personnel of World War II
4
Middlesex Regiment officers